The Crystal Kelly Cup or  Crystal Kelly Tournament (sometimes: Chrystal Kelly) was a prestigious, generously funded carom billiards invitational tournament in the discipline of three-cushion, which has been held at different venues from 1994 to 2011, a total of 18 times, mostly in Monte Carlo and Nice.

History 

The tournament was launched in 1994 by the businessman and software-founder of Volmac (since 1992 it belongs to the Cap Gemini Group), Joop van Oosterom, who is also a billiards and chess enthusiast. The tournament was named after his daughter Crystal Kelly van Oosterom, as well as for the Dutch Eredivisie club of "Crystal Kelly," which was also very successful. In 1992 Joop already dedicated Melody Amber, a blindfold and correspondence chess tournament, to his other daughter.

In 2010, Joop announced that he will give up the sponsorship the following year. Thus, the 2011-tournament was the last. Raymond Ceulemans, the three-cushion-legend form Belgium, was part of the tournament from the beginning on, from 1994 to 2006 as a player, in the early years he finished  he still finished as a front runner, though he never could win the tournament. After his retirement from active billiards sports (2006) he was the tournament director. Torbjörn Blomdahl and Dick Jaspers participated in all 18 tournaments, in which the latter is eight times record winner of the tournament and Blomdahl was second with 5 wins.

It was carrying out 13 times in Monte Carlo, 3 times in Nice and one time in Scheveningen and Antwerp as of the end of the season in early June. The only exception was in 2005 when the tournament was held in late August.

The tournament was one of the best-paid - the prizes were ever tournament always around U.S. $70,000, there were extra bonuses for services paid and the winner took home about $20,000 - its kind, similar to the AGIPI Billiard Masters in Schiltigheim, France and it was considered as "The little World Championship". Among the players who called the tournament also "The Monaco", it had a high reputation and everyone gladly followed the invitation of van Oosterom. They were all, including their wives/partners, flown in and have been guests of the family van Oosterom for a week. There was just one game each day for everyone on the time table, and so there was a lot of time for trips and excursions.

Only participant from America was Sang Chun Lee from the USA .

Tournament structure 

The number of participants ranged between eight and ten players. A total of 17 different players in the tournament. Many players have been invited over the years, such as: Semih Saygıner (16 ×), Frédéric Caudron (15 ×), Frans van Kuijk (13 ×), Marco Zanetti (11 ×) and Daniel Sánchez (8 ×). In the last tournament in 2011 the ten participants were divided into two groups of five players each.

These were:
 Groupe A: 
  Marco Zanetti
  Frédéric Caudron
  Eddy Merckx
  Frans van Kuijk
  Filippos Kasidokostas
 Groupe B:
  Dick Jaspers
  Torbjörn Blomdahl
  Daniel Sánchez
  Semih Saygıner
   Peter Ceulemans

The first stage was played in the round-robin mode with equal innings. The final round was played in a knock-out mode as first to 50 points without equal innings. The places 3-10 were played out.

Winners table 

Notes
  Blomdahl plays the unofficial world record of a GA of 2,324 and a SpA of 3,571 (dito 1996).
  Jaspers plays a SpA of 4,166.
  R. Ceulemans plays a SpA of 3,846.
  Jaspers plays a SpA of 5,000, 50 points in 10 innings.
  Blomdahl plays a SpA of 3,846
  In 2009 the best tournament average of 1,865 has been played.
  Jaspers plays a SpA of 4,545.
  Jaspers plays a record GA of 2,623, which is an unofficial record.

Gallery of the 1999 Cup

References 

Three-cushion billiards competitions
Recurring sporting events established in 1994
Recurring events disestablished in 2011